The Oghuric, Onoguric or Oguric languages (also known as Bulgar, Bulgharic, Pre-Proto-Bulgaric or Lir-Turkic and r-Turkic) are a branch of the Turkic language family. The only extant member of the group is the Chuvash language. The first to branch off from the Turkic family, the Oghuric languages show significant divergence from other Turkic languages, which all share a later common ancestor. Languages from this family were spoken in some nomadic tribal confederations, such as those of the Onogurs or Ogurs, Bulgars and Khazars.

History
The Oghuric languages are a distinct group of the Turkic languages, standing in contrast to Common Turkic. Today they are represented only by Chuvash. The only other language which is conclusively proven to be Oghuric is the long-extinct Bulgar, while Khazar may be a possible relative within the group. The Hunnic language is sometimes assumed to have been a Oghuric language, although such speculations are not based on proper linguistic evidence, since the language of the Huns is almost unknown except for a few attested words and personal names.

There is no consensus among linguists on the relation between Oghuric and Common Turkic and several questions remain unsolved:

Are they parallel branches of Proto-Turkic and, if so, which branch is more archaic?
Does Oghuric represent Archaic Turkic before phonetic changes in 100-400 AD and was it a separate language?

Fuzuli Bayat dates the separation into Oghur r-dialects and Oghuz z-dialects to the 2nd millennium BC.

Features
The Oghuric languages are also known as "-r Turkic" because the final consonant in certain words is r, not z as in Common Turkic.  -  -  - . Hence the name Oghur corresponds to Oghuz "tribe" in Common Turkic. Other correspondences are Com. š : Oghur l (tâš : tâl, 'stone'); s > š; *č > ś; k/q > ğ; y > j, ś; d, δ > δ > z (10th cent.) > r (13th cent.)"; ğd > z > r (14th cent.); a > ı (after 9th cent.). The shift from s to š operates before i, ï, and iV, and Dybo calls the sound change the "Bulgar palatalization".

Denis Sinor believed that the differences noted above suggest that the Oghur-speaking tribes could not have originated in territories inhabited by speakers of Mongolic languages, given that Mongolian dialects feature the  -z suffix. Peter Golden, however, has noted that there are many loanwords in Mongolic from Oghuric, such as Mongolic ikere, Oghuric *ikir, Hungarian iker, Common Turkic *ikiz 'twins', and holds the contradictory view that the Oghur inhabited the borderlands of Mongolia prior to the 5th century.

The Oghuric tribes are often connected with the Hungarians, whose exo-ethnonym is usually derived from On-Oğur (> (H)Ungari). Hungarians -> Hun Oghur -> (ten oghur tribes): On ogur -> up.chv. Won ogur -> dow.chv. Wun ogur -> belor. Wugorac -> rus. Wenger -> slove. Vogr, Vogrin -> cheh. pol. Węgier, Węgrzyn, -> lit. Veñgras.  The Hungarians are culturally of mixed Ugrian / Turkic heritage, with strong Oghuric-Bulgar and Khazar influences, even though much of the modern-day Hungarian genepool also has strong Slavic, Germanic, and Iranic influences. Hungarian has many borrowings from Turkic and Oghuric languages: Hung. tenger, Oghur. *tengir, Comm. *tengiz 'sea', Hung. gyűrű, Oghur. *ǰürük, Comm. *yüzük 'ring', and terms of equestrian culture ló 'horse', nyereg 'saddle', fék 'bridle', ostor 'whip'. A number of Hungarian loanwords were borrowed before the 9th century, shown by sz- (< Oğ. *ś-) rather than gy- (< Oğ. *ǰ-), for example Hung. szél, Oghur. *śäl, Chuv. śil,  Comm. *yel 'wind', Hung. szűcs 'tailor', Hung. szőlő 'grapes'.

In the Oghuz languages as azer. tur. öküz means ox (totemic animal), and is a reflection of the Chuvash language wăkăr where rhotacism is used, in the Kipchak languages it is ögiz.

See also
 Saragurs
 Kutrigurs
 Utigurs
 Oghur & Oghuz
 Oghur (tribe)
 Hunno-Bulgar languages

References

Sources
 

 
 
 

 
Agglutinative languages
Vowel-harmony languages